Protonarthron diabolicum is a species of beetle in the family Cerambycidae. It was described by James Thomson in 1858.

References

Protonarthrini
Beetles described in 1858